Statistics of Japan Soccer League for the 1979 season.

First Division

Promotion/relegation Series

Yamaha promoted, NKK relegated.

Second Division

Promotion/relegation Series

No relegations. Due to withdrawal of Yanmar Club, Yanmar Diesel's B-squad, Daikyo was promoted.

References
Japan - List of final tables (RSSSF)

1979
1
Jap
Jap